The 12th National Hockey League All-Star Game took place at the Montreal Forum on October 4, 1958. The hometown Montreal Canadiens defeated the NHL All-Stars 6–3.

Richard Brothers Lead Canadiens to Victory

Maurice "Rocket" Richard scored the first and last goals of the game, and brother Henri Richard scored the winning goal and added two assists to lead the Stanley Cup champion Montreal Canadiens to a 6–3 victory over the all-stars. Andy Bathgate of the New York Rangers scored twice for the All-Stars.

During the game, the Canadiens' Bernie "Boom Boom" Geoffrion had to be helped off the ice, after receiving a crushing body-check from Red Kelly of the Detroit Red Wings. Geoffrion suffered pulled chest and neck muscles, but was back in the line-up for the Canadiens' home opener a few days later.

Boxscore

Referee: Eddie Powers
Linesmen: George Hayes and William Morrison
Attendance: 13,989

References

National Hockey League All-Star Games
All-Star Game
1958
Ice hockey competitions in Montreal
National Hockey League All-Star Game
1950s in Montreal
1958 in Quebec